Two hundred and seventy-five scholars and artists were awarded Guggenheim Fellowships in 1956. More than $1,100,000 was disbursed and the number of fellows was the highest in the fellowship's history up to that date.

1956 U.S. and Canadian Fellows

1956 Latin American and Caribbean Fellows

See also
 Guggenheim Fellowship
 List of Guggenheim Fellowships awarded in 1955
 List of Guggenheim Fellowships awarded in 1957

References

1956
1956 awards